Karol Albert Jakub Kossok (28 January 1907 – 11 March 1946) was a Polish footballer who played as a forward, a.k.a. “the Silesian Giant”, Kossok was the best scorer of the Polish First Division in 1930 (with 24 goals).

Background Information 
Born in Katowice, Kossok’s career started in a German-minority team FC Preussen Kattowitz (later 1. FC Kattowitz), then in 1929 he moved to Cracovia. Also, in 1931 he played for Pogoń Lwów - another powerhouse of interwar Polish soccer. After a lone season in Lwow, he returned to Cracovia, where he played until winning the 1937 championship.

He played five games for the Poland national team (including one in 1932 as an unassociated player), scoring three goals (first game on 1 July 1928 in Katowice, 2–1 against Sweden). His tall, heavy frame deceived many defenders. Regarded by many as slow and sluggish, he was a natural killer in the penalty area and a very skilled dribbler. However, did not have enough strength and hardly managed to play his best for the whole 90 minutes. After finishing his career (due to several injuries), he became a coach in Cracovia, also helping Józef Kałuża with managing the national team.

During World War II, he signed the Volksliste, but his exact whereabouts at that time are not known. Some time in the summer of 1944 he was drafted into the Wehrmacht. Captured by the Red Army at the end of the war, he died in Soviet POW camp in East Germany in 1946 aged 39.

Sources 

 History of 1FC Katowice

1907 births
1946 deaths
Sportspeople from Katowice
People from the Province of Silesia
Polish footballers
MKS Cracovia (football) players
Poland international footballers
Pogoń Lwów players
Ekstraklasa players
Polish football managers
MKS Cracovia managers
Polonia Warsaw managers
Association football forwards
German Army personnel of World War II
German prisoners of war in World War II held by the Soviet Union
German people who died in Soviet detention
Volksdeutsche